The Roman Catholic Diocese of Ciego de Avila is a suffragan Latin diocese of the Metropolitan Archdiocese of Camagüey, in Cuba.

Its cathedral episcopal see is St. Eugene's Cathedral, Ciego de Ávila.

History 
 Established on 1996.02.02 as Diocese of Ciego de Ávila / Cæci Abulen(sis) (Latin), on Cuban territory split off from the then Diocese of Camagüey, now its Metropolitan.

Statistics 
As per 2015, it served 190,343 Catholics (40.9% of 465,628 total) on 7,887 km2 in 5 parishes and 36 missions with 8 priests (6 diocesan, 2 religious), 2 deacons, 18 lay religious (2 brothers, 16 sisters) and 1 seminarian .

Episcopal ordinaries
(all Roman Rite)

Suffragan Bishops of Ciego de Ávila 
 Mario Eusebio Mestril Vega (2 February 1996 - retired 2017.07.08), previously Titular Bishop of Cediæ (16 November 1991 – 2 February 1996) as Auxiliary Bishop of Camagüey (Cuba)
 Bishop-elect Juan Gabriel Diaz Ruiz (8 July 2017 – ...), no previous prelature.

See also 
 List of Catholic dioceses in Cuba

Sources and external links 
 GCatholic, with Google satellite photo - data for all sections
 

Roman Catholic dioceses in Cuba
Religious organizations established in 1996
Roman Catholic dioceses and prelatures established in the 20th century
Roman Catholic Ecclesiastical Province of Camagüey